This is a list of earthquakes in Nicaragua which directly impacted the country.

Earthquakes
Notable earthquakes in the history of Nicaragua include the following:

References

External links 

Dirección de Sismología – Instituto Nicaragüense de Estudios Territoriales (INETER)

 
Nicaragua
Earthquakes
Earthquakes